Copelatus descarpentriesi is a species of diving beetle. It is part of the genus Copelatus of the subfamily Copelatinae in the family Dytiscidae. It was described by Bertrand & Legros in 1975.

References

descarpentriesi
Beetles described in 1975